Doctor's Orders is a 1934 British comedy film directed by Norman Lee and starring Leslie Fuller, John Mills Marguerite Allan. It was produced by British International Pictures at the company's Elstree Studios. The film's sets were designed by the art director Cedric Dawe.

Plot
A respectable doctor discovers that his father has set up a less than reputable medical firm.

Cast
 Leslie Fuller as Bill Blake
 John Mills as Ronnie Blake
 Marguerite Allan as Gwen Summerfield
 Mary Jerrold as Mary Blake
 Ronald Shiner as Miggs
 Felix Aylmer as Sir Daniel Summerfield
 Georgie Harris as Duffin
 William Kendall as Jackson
 D. J. Williams as Napoleon
 Ronald Shiner as Miggs

References

Bibliography
 Low, Rachael. Filmmaking in 1930s Britain. George Allen & Unwin, 1985.
 Wood, Linda. British Films, 1927-1939. British Film Institute, 1986.

External links
 
 
 

1934 films
1934 comedy films
British black-and-white films
Films shot at British International Pictures Studios
Films directed by Norman Lee
British comedy films
1930s English-language films
1930s British films